The Leader of the Opposition in the Uttar Pradesh Legislative Assembly is the politician who leads the official opposition in  the Uttar Pradesh Legislative Assembly.

Eligibility
Official Opposition is a term used in Uttar Pradesh Legislative Assembly to designate the political party which has secured the second largest number of seats in the assembly. In order to get formal recognition, the party must have at least 10% of total membership of the Legislative Assembly. A single party has to meet the 10% seat criterion, not an alliance. Many of the Indian state legislatures also follows this 10% rule while the rest of them prefer single largest opposition party according to the rules of their respective houses.

Role
The opposition's main role is to question the government of the day and hold them accountable to the public. The opposition is equally responsible in upholding the best interests of the people of the country. They have to ensure that the Government does not take any steps, which might have negative effects on the people of the country.

The role of the opposition in legislature is basically to check the excesses of the ruling or dominant party, and not to be totally antagonistic. There are actions of the ruling party which may be beneficial to the masses and opposition is expected to support such steps.

In legislature, opposition party has a major role and must act to discourage the party in power from acting against the interests of the country and the common man. They are expected to alert the population and the Government on the content of any bill, which is not in the best interests of the country.

List of Leaders of the Opposition of Uttar Pradesh

See also
 Government of Uttar Pradesh
 Governor of Uttar Pradesh
 Chief Minister of Uttar Pradesh
 Uttar Pradesh Legislative Assembly
 Uttar Pradesh Council of Ministers
 Allahabad High Court#List of Chief Justices
 Official Opposition
 Leader of the Opposition in the Parliament of India
 List of current Indian opposition leaders

References

 
Uttar Pradesh Legislative Assembly